Heiti Talvik (9 November 1904 – 18 July 1947) was an Estonian poet.

Life and literary career 

Heiti Talvik's father was a family doctor based in Tartu and his mother was a pianist. In 1923 he left the school early and initially sought work in oil shale mining at Kohtla-Järve. During that time he wrote poetry which was published in the literary magazine Looming (Creation), then edited by Friedebert Tuglas.

In 1926 he completed his study at a gymnasium (secondary school) in Pärnu. After his graduation he studied at the Philosophical Faculty of the University of Tartu from 1926 to 1934.

After 1928, Talvik dedicated himself more and more to poetry. In 1934, after the publication of the poetry collection Palavik (Fever), he became one of the most famous Estonian poets and  a member of the writers group Arbujad (Shaman). The circle included the poet Betti Alver, who married Talvik in 1937.

With the occupation of Estonia by the Soviet Union, Heiti Talvik was deported to Siberia in May 1945, never to be heard of again. He probably died in July 1947 as a consequence of the deportation, the location of his grave being unknown.

Poetry collections 
 Palavik (1934)
 Kohtupäev (1937)

References 

1904 births
1947 deaths
Writers from Tartu
People from Kreis Dorpat
Estonian male poets
20th-century Estonian poets
20th-century male writers
University of Tartu alumni
Estonian prisoners and detainees
Estonian people who died in Soviet detention
People who died in the Gulag